The 2006–07 Liga Leumit season began on 25 August 2006 and ended on 26 May 2007. Ironi Kiryat Shmona won the title and were promoted to the Premier League for the first time in their history. Runners-up Bnei Sakhnin were also promoted.

Hapoel Ashkelon (who reached the State Cup final) and Hapoel Jerusalem were relegated to Liga Artzit.

Final table

External links
Israel (Second Level) 2006/07 RSSSF

Liga Leumit seasons
Israel
2006–07 in Israeli football leagues